Iván Ortega (born 22 July 1971) is a Mexican modern pentathlete. He competed at the 1992 Summer Olympics.

References

1971 births
Living people
Mexican male modern pentathletes
Olympic modern pentathletes of Mexico
Modern pentathletes at the 1992 Summer Olympics